Frances Teresa Shea-Buckley (February 26, 1929 – July 8, 2015) was a United States rear admiral who served as Director of the United States Navy Nurse Corps from 1979 to 1983.

Early life
Frances Teresa Shea was born on February 26, 1929, in Massachusetts. She earned a Bachelor of Science degree from St. Joseph College in Hartford, Connecticut, in 1950.

Navy Nurse Corps career
Shea joined the Navy Nurse Corps in 1951 and stayed in the Reserves when she left active duty in 1954. She earned a Master of Science degree in nursing service administration from DePaul University in Chicago, Illinois, in 1960, and returned to active duty.
Shea became director of the Navy Nurse Corps in 1979, and became the first director to add additional concurrent billets to that duty, including commanding officer of Naval Health Sciences Education and Training Command, and deputy commander for Personnel Management, Naval Medical Command.

References

Further reading

External links
 Nurses and the U.S. Navy -- Overview and Special Image Selection Naval Historical Center

1929 births
2015 deaths
American nursing administrators
Female wartime nurses
People from Massachusetts
United States Navy personnel of the Vietnam War 
American female military personnel of the Vietnam War
Female admirals of the United States Navy
United States Navy rear admirals
United States Navy Nurse Corps officers
Vietnam War nurses